Bala Mahalleh-ye Barka Deh (also Romanized as Bālā Maḩalleh-ye Barkā Deh; also known as Barkādeh and Bozkāh Deh) is a village in Belesbeneh Rural District, Kuchesfahan District, Rasht County, Gilan Province, Iran. At the 2006 census, its population was 362, in 107 families.

References 

Populated places in Rasht County